Izaskun Manuel Llados is a Spanish Paralympic alpine skier. She competed in the 1994 Paralympic Winter Games in Lillehammer. She won two medals, one silver and one bronze.

Career 
At the 1994 Winter Paralympics in Lillehammer, she finished second in the slalom race, in a time of 2:38.84; on the podium, in 1st place the Swedish athlete Åsa Bengtsson in 2: 14.24 and in 3rd place the Italian athlete Silvia Parente in 4: 09.33. She finished third in the downhill race, in 1:38.74, behind New Zealander Joanne Duffy in 1: 28.58 and compatriot Magda Amo in 1:37.87.  She also competed in other events, finishing seventh in the giant slalom with a time of 3: 21.07,  and eighth in the supergiant in 1: 41.82.

References 

Living people
Sportspeople from Biscay
Paralympic alpine skiers of Spain
Spanish female alpine skiers
Alpine skiers at the 1994 Winter Paralympics
Medalists at the 1994 Winter Paralympics
Paralympic silver medalists for Spain
Paralympic bronze medalists for Spain
Date of birth missing (living people)